New Guinea Patrol is a 1958 Australian documentary film produced  by R. Maslyn Williams.

The film is regarded as a classic.

References

External links
New Guinea Patrol at IMDb

Australian documentary films